Melville Bay, is a large bay off the coast of northwestern Greenland. Located to the north of the Upernavik Archipelago, it opens to the south-west into Baffin Bay. Its Kalaallisut name, Qimusseriarsuaq, means "the great dog sledding place".

The bay was named after Robert Dundas, 2nd Viscount Melville, (1771 - 1851) head of the Admiralty.

Geography
Melville Bay is delimited by Cape York in the northeast and Wilcox Head, the western promontory on Kiatassuaq Island in the south.
Some islands of the Upernavik Archipelago are in the Melville Bay area, such as Kiatassuaq Island, Kullorsuaq Island, Saarlia Island and Saqqarlersuaq Island. Melville Bay is free of fast ice between mid August and the end of September on average. Navigation is dangerous as there are numerous icebergs in the bay throughout the year.

History
In the 19th century Melville Bay was an important place for whaling fleets.

See also
Cape York (Greenland)
Wandel Land

References

External links 

 Satellite image. Source: WikiMapia

 
Bays of the Upernavik Archipelago